Masters Inn is a chain of motels in the United States. The chain operates 15 locations in 6 states.

The first location existed in Kansas City in 1985 through the name change of a previously existing motel.

In 2007, the chain was acquired by Supertel. The group sold its Cave City, Kentucky location in 2010.

See also
 List of motels

External links

References

Hotel chains in the United States
Motels in the United States